Jalan Senawang–Paroi, Federal Route, is a federal road in Seremban, Negeri Sembilan, Malaysia. It starts at Paroi and ends at Senawang.

At most sections, the Federal Route 97 was built under the JKR U4 road standard, allowing maximum speed limit of up to 70  km/h.

List of intersections

Note: The entire length of this road is located within the district of Seremban, Negeri Sembilan.

 I/C - interchange, I/S - intersection RSA - Rest and service area, L/B - layby, BR - bridge

References

Malaysian Federal Roads
Highways in Malaysia